River Burn may refer to:

The River Burn, Devon, a tributary of the River Tavy on Dartmoor in the county of Devon, England
The River Burn, Norfolk, which flows into the North Sea at Burnham Overy Staithe in the county of Norfolk, England
The River Burn, North Yorkshire, tributary of the River Ure